James Michael Moynihan (July 6, 1932 – March 6, 2017) was an American prelate of the Roman Catholic Church. He was the ninth Bishop of Syracuse.

Biography
James Moynihan was born in Rochester, New York, to Michael Joseph and Carolyn Elizabeth (née Horigan) Moynihan; he had one sister, Carol Anne. He graduated Nazareth Hall School for Boys in 1946, and then attended St. Andrew's Seminary High School until 1950, and St. Andrew and St. Bernard Seminary College, graduating in 1954 with his Bachelor of Arts degree. Moynihan then traveled to Rome, where he studied at the Pontifical North American College, from where he obtained his licentiate in theology, and the Pontifical Gregorian University, earning a doctorate in canon law summa cum laude. He was ordained to the priesthood, for the Diocese of Rochester, by Archbishop Martin O'Connor on December 15, 1957, at the chapel of the North American College.

Upon his return to the United States, Moynihan became associate pastor at Our Lady of Mt. Carmel in Rochester in 1961, also serving as defender of the bond and promoter of justice in the diocesan tribunal (1961–1966). He was the private secretary of Bishop James Kearney from 1963 to 1966, and was later made Vice-Chancellor (1965) and Chancellor (1967) of Rochester.

In the capacity of Catholic chaplain, Moynihan served the Monroe County jail, Rochester police department (1962–1973), and Highland Hospital (1974–1976). Moynihan then served as pastor of St. Joseph's Church in Penfield until 1991. Then he became associate secretary general of the Catholic Near East Welfare Association, which he successfully registered with the U.S. Agency for International Development. In addition to his other duties, he was director of the Bishop's Annual Catholic Thanksgiving Appeal from 1985-89. He was raised to the rank of Chaplain to His Holiness in 1993.

On April 4, 1995, Moynihan was appointed the ninth Bishop of Syracuse by Pope John Paul II. He received his episcopal consecration on the following May 29 from John Cardinal O’Connor, with Bishops Joseph O'Keefe and Matthew Clark serving as co-consecrators. 

In 1998, Moynihan removed Fr. Richard McBrien as a columnist for the diocesan newspaper, replacing him with the more theologically conservative writer George Weigel, much to the clergy's dismay. In November 2001 he released a pastoral letter to the people of Syracuse entitled: Equipping the Saints for the Work of Ministry.  

The Bishop was a founding member of the Bishop Sheen Ecumenical Housing Foundation, named after the Servant of God Fulton J. Sheen, as well. He retired on 26 May 2009. He was succeeded by Bishop Robert J. Cunningham. 

Moynihan died on March 6, 2017, at the age of 84.

References

External links
Diocese of Syracuse

1932 births
2017 deaths
20th-century Roman Catholic bishops in the United States
Roman Catholic bishops of Syracuse
Religious leaders from Rochester, New York
21st-century Roman Catholic bishops in the United States